Liao Xiaoyan (born 8 January 1987) is a Chinese track and field athlete who competes in the hammer throw. She was the gold medallist at the 2007 Asian Athletics Championships.

Among her first major national competitions was the 2005 Chinese City Games, where she was runner-up to future Olympic medallist Zhang Wenxiu. While Zhang had the second best throw ever by a youth athlete, Liao's throw of  ranked her the fifth best ever youth at that point. She still ranks within the top ten youth hammer throwers, as of 2015. She established herself within the top senior domestic athletes in the 2005 season.

She failed to make the Olympic team for the 2008 Beijing Olympics, ending the season with a best of  that year.

References

External links

Living people
1987 births
Chinese female hammer throwers
20th-century Chinese women
21st-century Chinese women